Rafael Reavis (born July 27, 1977) is a Filipino-American professional basketball player for the Magnolia Hotshots of the Philippine Basketball Association (PBA).

Professional career
Reavis first played for the San Juan Knights in the Metropolitan Basketball Association in 2000.

After the Metropolitan Basketball Association folded in 2002, Reavis decided to apply for the 2002 PBA draft, where he was picked second overall by the Coca-Cola Tigers.

He had a good run during his time with the Tigers before being involved in one of the most controversial trades in PBA history. The trade involved Rudy Hatfield, Billy Mamaril, Aries Dimaunahan, and Ervin Sotto.

Barangay Ginebra traded Reavis, Paul Artadi, and the rights to 2009 eighth pick overall Chris Timberlake for Enrico Villanueva, Rich Alvarez, Celino Cruz, and Paolo Bugia of Purefoods. Burger King acted as the conduit team, trading Pocholo Villanueva to Ginebra and acquiring the rights to 2009 Rookie draft 18th pick Orlando Daroya and future picks.

PBA career statistics

As of the end of 2021 season

Season-by-season averages

|-
| align=left | 
| align=left | Coca-Cola
| 30 || 14.2 || .513 || .500 || .486 || 3.8 || .8 || .2 || .3 || 4.6
|-
| align=left | 
| align=left | Coca-Cola
| 65 || 28.3 || .584 || .000 || .516 || 8.0 || 1.6 || .8 || .9 || 10.4
|-
| align=left | 
| align=left | Coca-Cola
| 59 || 31.2 || .540 || .143 || .522 || 9.0 || 1.3 || .7 || 1.1 || 8.9
|-
| align=left | 
| align=left | Coca-Cola
| 33 || 34.6 || .523 || .000 || .566 || 11.2 || 1.1 || .6 || 1.3 || 8.3
|-
| align=left | 
| align=left | Barangay Ginebra
| 30 || 26.4 || .564 || .000 || .533 || 8.5 || .9 || .6 || 1.0 || 8.3
|-
| align=left | 
| align=left | Barangay Ginebra
| 35 || 25.9 || .509 || .000 || .524 || 8.3 || 1.3 || .6 || .5 || 6.2
|-
| align=left | 
| align=left | Barangay Ginebra
| 33 || 19.0 || .592 || .000 || .515 || 5.1 || .9 || .4 || .6 || 4.6
|-
| align=left | 
| align=left | Purefoods / B-Meg Derby Ace
| 61 || 26.9 || .529 || – || .458 || 7.7 || .8 || .7 || .8 || 5.5
|-
| align=left | 
| align=left | B-Meg Derby Ace
| 10 || 15.0 || .481 || – || .667 || 3.9 || .4 || .4 || .6 || 3.0
|-
| align=left | 
| align=left | B-Meg
| 62 || 16.1 || .488 || – || .542 || 4.8 || .8 || .3 || .6 || 4.2
|-
| align=left | 
| align=left | San Mig Coffee
| 60 || 16.3 || .565 || – || .598 || 4.0 || .7 || .3 || .7 || 3.6
|-
| align=left | 
| align=left | San Mig Super Coffee
| 67 || 15.4 || .505 || .000 || .614 || 4.3 || .7 || .3 || .3 || 3.7
|-
| align=left | 
| align=left | Purefoods / Star
| 40 || 12.5 || .569 || – || .583 || 3.5 || .4 || .4 || .6 || 2.2
|-
| align=left | 
| align=left | Star
| 27 || 11.5 || .565 || – || .545 || 3.6 || .4 || .1 || .3 || 2.4
|-
| align=left | 
| align=left | Star
| 51 || 17.8 || .579 || .000 || .656 || 5.0 || .7 || .5 || .8 || 4.8
|-
| align=left | 
| align=left | Magnolia
| 53 || 19.8 || .443 || .000 || .559 || 5.0 || 1.1 || .8 || .7 || 4.0
|-
| align=left | 
| align=left | Magnolia
| 42 || 21.9 || .514 || – || .652 || 6.2 || .5 || .7 || .5 || 5.5
|-
| align=left | 
| align=left | Magnolia
| 11 || 28.1 || .471 || – || .706 || 6.5 || 1.4 || .4 || .5 || 4.0
|-
| align=left | 
| align=left | Magnolia
| 38 || 18.8 || .500 || – || .585 || 4.6 || .6 || .5 || .3 || 2.6
|-class=sortbottom
| align=center colspan=2 | Career
| 807 || 21.2 || .534 || .097 || .548 || 6.0 || .9 || .5 || .7 || 5.3

Personal life
Reavis was born as Rafael Pangilinan Reavis on July 27, 1977, in New York City. His father is Joselito Abundo and was born on Koronadal, South Cotabato. Abundo went to the US when he was 17 and was adopted by the Reavis family. Abundo met Reavis' mother, Laura Missouri, in New York City. After three years, they broke up, and Reavis went with his mother in Florida where his mother married and became Laura Fields. Abundo died in 1999 due to prostate cancer.

References

External links
 Barangay Ginebra Kings
 Rookie hopeful Reavis prefers Gins in PBA
 Rafi Reavis: A captain after The Captain
 Player Profile at PBA-Online!
 Metropolitan Basketball Association (1998–2002)

1977 births
Living people
Basketball players from New York City
African-American basketball players
Barangay Ginebra San Miguel players
Centers (basketball)
Coppin State Eagles men's basketball players
Filipino men's basketball players
Magnolia Hotshots players
Philippine Basketball Association All-Stars
Power forwards (basketball)
Powerade Tigers players
San Juan Knights players
American men's basketball players
Powerade Tigers draft picks
21st-century African-American sportspeople
20th-century African-American sportspeople
Citizens of the Philippines through descent
American sportspeople of Filipino descent